Natalia Smirnoff (born 14 May 1972) is an Argentine film director and screenwriter. Her 2010 film Rompecabezas was nominated for the Golden Bear at the 60th Berlin International Film Festival.

Filmography
 Rompecabezas (2010)
 Lock Charmer (2014)

References

External links

1972 births
Living people
Argentine film directors
Argentine screenwriters